Ponnabeth Mambally Anandan (born 1 December 1924) is a former cricketer who played first-class cricket in India from 1951 to 1957.

Anandan was an opening bowler who made his first-class debut in 1951-52 in what was also Travancore-Cochin's first first-class match. He took five or more wickets in an innings in each of his first three matches: 6 for 100 against Mysore in 1951-52, 5 for 65 against Mysore in 1952-53, and 5 for 38 against Hyderabad in 1953-54. 

His older brother P. M. Raghavan also played first-class cricket for Travancore-Cochin.

References

External links

1924 births
Possibly living people
Indian cricketers
Kerala cricketers
Travancore-Cochin cricketers
People from Thalassery